Iswar Marandi (15 December 1918 – 7 August 1972) was an Indian politician. He was elected to the Lok Sabha, lower house of the Parliament of India from Rajmahal, Bihar as a member of the Indian National Congress. Marandi died whilst in office, on 7 August 1972, at the age of 53.

References

External links
 Official biographical sketch in Parliament of India website

1918 births
1972 deaths
India MPs 1962–1967
India MPs 1967–1970
India MPs 1971–1977
Indian National Congress politicians
Lok Sabha members from Bihar
Pakur district